Leutnant Karl Plauth was a German World War I flying ace credited with 17 aerial victories. He would crash a Junkers A 32 to his death on a test flight.

Biography
See also Aerial victory standards of World War I

Karl Plauth was born on 27 August 1896 in Munich, Germany.

Plauth originally served in a pioneer battalion early in the First World War. After being wounded during the Battle of Verdun and earning a First Class Iron Cross, he transferred to flying service. After a stint in Flieger-Abteilung 204 (Flier Detachment 204), he was assigned to fly a Fokker D.VII with Royal Prussian Jagdstaffel 20 (Fighter Squadron 20) on 14 June 1918. Plauth scored his first triumph on 9 July 1918.

On 14 July, he was shot down, totaling his airplane, lacerating his head and blackening his eye. He was grounded for eight days because of the eye. That did not deter him from scoring again on the 31st. By 28 September, his tally stood at 10. The following day, he became the Staffelführer of Royal Prussian Jagdstaffel 51. As their leader, he shot down seven more enemy aircraft during October, 1918, bringing his total to 17. However, he was no killer; he preferred to see his opponents survive.

He was piloting the Junkers A 32, which he helped design, on a test flight on 2 November 1927, when it failed to pull out of a loop. He died in the resultant crash.

End notes

References 

 Above the Lines: The Aces and Fighter Units of the German Air Service, Naval Air Service and Flanders Marine Corps, 1914–1918. Norman Franks, Frank W. Bailey, Russell Guest. Grub Street, 1993. , .

 Fokker D.VII Aces of World War I, Part 2. Greg VanWyngarden, Harry Dempsey. Osprey Publishing, 2004.

Further reading

 Junkers Aircraft and Engines, 1913-1945. Antony L. Kay, Paul Couper. Naval Institute Press, 2004. , 

1896 births
1927 deaths
German World War I flying aces
Military personnel from Munich
Aircraft designers
Recipients of the Iron Cross (1914), 1st class
Victims of aviation accidents or incidents in 1927
Aviators killed in aviation accidents or incidents in Germany